In computer science, the International Conference on Computer-Aided Verification (CAV) is an annual academic conference on the theory and practice of computer-aided formal analysis of software and hardware systems, broadly known as formal methods. It is one of the highest-ranked conferences in computer science. Among the important results originally published in CAV are breakthrough techniques in model checking, such as Counterexample-Guided Abstraction Refinement (CEGAR) and partial order reduction.

The first CAV was held in 1989 in Grenoble, France. The CAV proceedings (1989-present) are published by Springer Science+Business Media and are open access.

See also 
 List of computer science conferences
 Symposium on Logic in Computer Science
 European Joint Conferences on Theory and Practice of Software

External links 

bibliography for CAV at DBLP
Conference proceedings

References 

Theoretical computer science conferences
Logic conferences